Vastus is an unincorporated community in southern Butler County, in the U.S. state of Missouri.

The community is on Missouri Route H. Neelyville is five miles t the west, the Black River flows past 3.5 miles to the east and the Missouri-Arkansas border is 3.5 miles to the south.

History
A post office called Vastus was established in 1891, and remained in operation until 1927. Vastus is a name derived from Latin, signifying "great".

References

Unincorporated communities in Butler County, Missouri
Unincorporated communities in Missouri